Beverly is a historic home located in Pocomoke City, Worcester County, Maryland, United States. It is a -story, Georgian-style Flemish bond brick house built about 1770. The house faces the Pocomoke River. An original circular ice house survives on the property.

Beverly was listed on the National Register of Historic Places in 1975.

Littleton Dennis, great great grandson of John Dennis of Beverly England, died in 1774 before the house was finished but work went on and was completed by his widow Susanna Upshur Dennis and their children and their descendants lived in the house for nearly 150 years.

References

External links
, including photo from 1988, at Maryland Historical Trust

Houses in Worcester County, Maryland
Houses on the National Register of Historic Places in Maryland
Houses completed in 1770
Georgian architecture in Maryland
National Register of Historic Places in Worcester County, Maryland
1770 establishments in Maryland